Sujeewa Senasinghe (Sinhala: සුජීව සේනසිංහ; born 13 December 1971) is a Sri Lankan lawyer and former politician. He was a member of the Parliament of Sri Lanka and the State Minister for International Trade until 2019.

Early life and education
Senasinghe was born in Kandy, the son of Stanley Senasinghe, a senior lawyer in Kandy and Upamalika Senasinghe, a lecturer. He is the youngest of three brothers; his brothers are Namal and Chaminda. Sujeewa was educated at Trinity College, Kandy and at the Sri Lanka Law College.

Political career
Sujeewa obtained 117,049 preferential votes from the Colombo district at the General Elections held on 17 August 2015. This was the second highest number of preferential votes obtained by a United National Party member from the Colombo district.

He was appointed Deputy Minister of Justice on 12 January 2015 under 100 Days Program. He belongs to the United National Party.

In 2017 he was appointed State Minister of Trade and Investment and in 2019 the Non-Cabinet Minister of Science and Technology, under Prime Minister Ranil Wickramasinghe.

On 28 September 2020, Sujeewa decided to step down from politics after the defeat in 2020 Sri Lankan parliamentary election and losing his seat.

References

Members of the 14th Parliament of Sri Lanka
Members of the 15th Parliament of Sri Lanka
United National Party politicians
1971 births
Living people
Deputy ministers of Sri Lanka
Sinhalese politicians
Alumni of Trinity College, Kandy